Henry Long may refer to:

 Henry Long (died 1490) (c. 1417–1490), English landowner and Member of Parliament, of Draycot, Wiltshire
 Henry Long (died 1556) (c. 1489–1556), English landowner and Member of Parliament, of Draycot, Wiltshire
 Henry Long (died 1573) (1544–1573), English landowner and Member of Parliament for Cambridgeshire
 Henry Long (footballer) (1914–1989), English footballer
 Henry M. Long (1836–1909), politician and businessman in Pennsylvania
 Henry Long (speedway rider), South African speedway rider

See also
 Harry Long (disambiguation)